The St. Regis Museum Tower, is a hotel and residential skyscraper that is located South of Market just outside the Financial District on the corner of Mission Street and Third Street in San Francisco. On the first three floors of the tower is the Museum of the African Diaspora.

History 
Construction started in 2001 and the building officially opened in 2005. It is a 5-star hotel renowned for redefining luxury hospitality in San Francisco. It was remodeled in April 2022. The tower has 90 suites, 286 high end hotel units, and 376 rooms total. At the time of its completion, it was the tallest concrete building west of the Mississippi River.

Gallery

See also 

 List of tallest buildings in San Francisco

References

External links 

  – Building ID #100480

Skyscraper hotels in San Francisco
St. Regis hotels
Hotels in San Francisco
Residential buildings in San Francisco